Vipond is a surname. Notable people with the surname include:

Dougie Vipond (born 1966), Scottish musician and television presenter
Jonathan Vipond, American politician
Pete Vipond (born 1949), Canadian ice hockey player
Shaun Vipond (born 1988), English footballer
Tim Vipond (born 1982), Canadian businessperson

See also
Vieuxpont